Millcreek Township School District is a school district serving Millcreek Township, a suburb of Erie, Pennsylvania. The total enrollment is 7,464 students. The District was the pilot district in the Start S.M.A.R.T. Program in 2002.

Schools
The Millcreek Township School District is home to 10 schools.

Elementary schools
Chestnut Hill Elementary 
Tracy Elementary
Belle Valley Elementary School
Asbury Elementary School
Grandview Elementary School

Middle schools

Walnut Creek Middle School
James S. Wilson Middle School 
Westlake Middle School

Walnut Creek Middle School
From 2000-2002 students at the school worked with the Asbury Woods Nature Center in a project to assess the Walnut Creek watershed to help with public education and protection of the natural resource.

The development of the nature center's educational program was one of a number of environmental education projects undertaken by students the school's science classes. A class, calling itself "Walnut Creek S.E.W.E.R." (Saving Erie's Water & Environmental Resources), also worked on projects to educate their community "about cleaner water, including a billboard and brochures, such as Your Lawn & Pesticides: What Goes Around, Comes Around," according to The Carnegie Reporter. "They have also worked with local officials to increase street sweeping, which reduces runoff into the water."
Asbury middle school

High schools
McDowell High School
McDowell Intermediate High School

Technical/ Alternative Education
Millcreek Learning Center
North Coast School
Students in 10th Grade or above can take courses at [Erie County Technical School]

Notes

External links

Pennsylvania Department of Education information Web page for the district
Main Web page of the school district at Great Schools Web site

Educational institutions established in 1805
Millcreek School District
1805 establishments in Pennsylvania